Yuzhna Lomuvatka is an urban-type settlement in Brianka Municipality in Alchevsk Raion of Luhansk Oblast in eastern Ukraine. Population:

Demographics
Native language distribution as of the Ukrainian Census of 2001:
 Ukrainian: 9.15%
 Russian: 90.73%
 Others: 0.06%

References

Urban-type settlements in Alchevsk Raion